Grga Novak (2April 18887September 1978) was a distinguished Croatian historian, archaeologist and geographer, and President of the Yugoslav Academy of Sciences and Arts from 1958 to 1978. Born on the island of Hvar, he was Professor of Ancient History in the University of Zagreb,  where he was also Rector between 1946 and 1947. He is best known for pioneering archaeology in Croatia, and his publications on the history of Dalmatia, Split, Dubrovnik, Hvar and the Adriatic Islands.

Biography
Grga Novak studied history, archaeology, and geography in Zagreb, Prague and Vienna, receiving his doctorate in 1913. From 1920, he taught in the Philosophy Faculty in Skoplje (then part of the University of Belgrade), then moved to the University of Zagreb, where he taught ancient history from 1924 to 1959. Dr Novak was a fellow of the Yugoslav Academy of Sciences and Arts in Zagreb from 1939, serving as its President from 1958 to 1978.

Research and publications
Grga Novak was the most important Croatian scholar of his generation in the field of history and archaeology. His area of expertise covered the Ancient World (Greece, Rome, Egypt), in addition to having a deep knowledge of the history of Croatia, especially Dalmatia and the Adriatic Sea and its islands. He wrote extensively, lectured and travelled.

The most important publications of this distinguished Croatian historian were his History of Split (in three volumes), histories of Hvar, Vis, and Dubrovnik, as well as a comprehensive history of Dalmatia in the ancient world. Dr Novak also published five volumes of Governors' reports about Dalmatia, based on material from Venetian archives. His book on the prehistoric sites of Hvar, with the results of his archaeological research form the basis for the further excavation and research of the Adriatic Islands Project.

The Mediterranean Institute Grga Novak on Hvar was established in 1998 by a group of writers and scholars to promote scholarship, art and public activity in Dalmatia. One of the founding members is Slobodan Prosperov Novak, the nephew of Grga Novak.

The Archaeological Collection and Lapidarium of Dr. Grga Novak is displayed in the former Dominican Saint Mark's church in Hvar, as part of the Hvar Heritage Museum. It is the most comprehensive private Neolithic collection of artifacts in the Mediterranean region.

Works

Notes

References

External links
 Archaeological Collection and Lapidarium of Dr. Grga Novak, Hvar Heritage Museum 
 Croatian Academy of Sciences and Arts

1888 births
1978 deaths
20th-century Croatian historians
People from Hvar (city)
People from the Kingdom of Dalmatia
Academic staff of the University of Zagreb
Rectors of the University of Zagreb
Members of the Croatian Academy of Sciences and Arts
Academic staff of the University of Belgrade